Broadcast Film Critics Association Awards 2008 may refer to:

 13th Critics' Choice Awards, the thirteenth Critics' Choice Awards ceremony that took place in 2008
 14th Critics' Choice Awards, the fourteenth Critics' Choice Awards ceremony that took place in 2009 and which honored the best in film for 2008